Emil Robert Wilhelm Steinbach (11 June 1846, Vienna – 26 May 1907, Purkersdorf, Lower Austria) was an Austrian politician.

In collaboration with Minister-President Eduard Taaffe he managed as Minister of Finance 1891-93 some important reforms in imperial Austria like the extension of the right to vote, the implementation of a currency reform 1892 and the reorganisation of the system of income tax. In 1904-07 he was President of the Austrian Supreme Court of Justice.

Sources 
 Fritz, Wolfgang: Finanzminister Emil Steinbach. Der Sohn des Goldarbeiters. Lit, Vienna, 2007, . (German)

External links 
 Emil Steinbach on aeiou

19th-century Austrian people
Austro-Hungarian politicians
People from Mariahilf
1846 births
1907 deaths